Sign Systems Studies is a peer-reviewed academic journal on semiotics edited at the Department of Semiotics of the University of Tartu and published by the University of Tartu Press. It is the oldest periodical in the field. It was initially published in Russian and since 1998 in English with Russian and Estonian language abstracts. The journal was established by Juri Lotman as Trudy po Znakovym Sistemam in 1964. Since 1998 it has been edited by  Kalevi Kull, Mihhail Lotman, and Peeter Torop. The journal is available online from the Philosophy Documentation Center, indexed by WoS and Scopus, and starting 2012 also on an open access platform.

References

External links
 
  (open access version, starting vol. 26, 1998)
  (volumes 1 to 25 as pdf files)
 Journals of semiotics in the world

Semiotics journals
Publications established in 1964
Quarterly journals
Multilingual journals
University of Tartu
Philosophy Documentation Center academic journals
Academic journals of Estonia